The Real Plaza Trujillo is a mall located in the Peruvian city of Trujillo in La Libertad Region of northern Peru. It is located at the intersection of Cesar Vallejo West and Fatima avenues, southwest of the Historic Centre of Trujillo. It is owned by Interseguro (Interbank Group) and was inaugurated on November 15, 2007, the first building of its kind in the city. The mall was built on a plot of 81,000 m², during construction generating more than 1,000 direct jobs and over 1,000 indirect jobs. The investment of nearly 100 million soles.

Related companies
Mall Aventura Plaza Trujillo
Open Plaza Los Jardines

See also
Historic Centre of Trujillo

External links
 Location of Real Plaza Trujillo (Wikimapia)

References

Malls in Trujillo, Peru